Ng Lam Hua was a Malaysian politician from DAP. He was the Member of Johor State Legislative Assembly for Mengkibol from 2008 to 2013.

Politics 
He was the Chief of DAP Kluang division and Taman Intan branch. He was dropped as the candidate for Mengkibol in the 2013 Malaysian general election and was promised to be named as a candidate for another constituency by Lim Guan Eng, but the promise was not kept.

Election result

Health 
He passed away due to a heart attack in his house on 29 September 2013.

References 

People from Johor
Democratic Action Party (Malaysia) politicians
Members of the Johor State Legislative Assembly
Malaysian people of Chinese descent
Malaysian politicians of Chinese descent
1949 births
2013 deaths